Macbeth is a 1911 film  adaptation of the William Shakespeare play Macbeth; no prints are known to exist. Like all films of the time, it is silent and black-and-white,  with English intertitles; it ran for 14 minutes.

Main cast and crew
William Barker (Director)
Frank Benson as Macbeth
Constance Benson as Lady Macbeth
Murray Carrington
Guy Rathbone

External links

References

1911 films
Lost British films
Films based on Macbeth
British black-and-white films
British silent short films
1911 lost films